Fort Blockhouse is a military establishment in Gosport, Hampshire, England, and the final version of a complicated site. At its greatest extent in the 19th century, the structure was part of a set of fortifications which encircled much of Gosport. It is surrounded on three sides by water and provides the best view of the entrance to Portsmouth Harbour. It is unique in two respects. Firstly, it was built over five centuries from its original construction as a blockhouse in 1431 to the final addition of submarine base structures in the mid-1960s. Secondly, it is thought to be the oldest fortified position in the United Kingdom that is still in active military use though coastal fortification was abolished nationally in 1956, and it has been used only for medical purposes since 2020.

History

Early fortifications (1431–1667)

Following the burning of Portsmouth during the Hundred Years' War, money was set aside in 1417 to provide protection for Portsmouth Harbour. A blockhouse was first built on the Gosport side of the harbour in 1431 after authorisation by Henry VI. A chain was strung from Blockhouse point to a similar tower in Portsmouth, which could be raised to prevent entry to the harbour by enemy ships.

The blockhouse was replaced in 1539 by an eight-gun battery under the orders of Henry VIII after his divorce from Catherine of Aragon. Blockhouse was supported by secondary fort to the south from 1545 to 1556, named Haselworth Castle, though this was abandoned only eleven years after construction. A plan to move the dockyard from Portsmouth to Gosport in 1627 never came to fruition, though storehouses for the new docks were built on the site. In 1642, during the English Civil War, the fort was used to bombard Portsmouth, which was at the time under Royalist control.

Modernised fort (1667–1877)

The fortification was extensively reworked in 1667 when Bernard de Gomme installed new defences at the order of Charles II. Two towers, named James Fort and Charles Fort, were completed by 1679, though the full plans involved additional earthworks that were never constructed.

An inspection in the early 18th century found that the defences had fallen into poor condition. In 1708 the fortifications were completely rebuilt, with 21 guns facing the sea and significant earthworks. The 1708 works are the oldest still present on the site. The defences to the north were expanded in 1757, in order to enclose the Weevil brewery, which in the preceding fifty years had become an important supply of beer for the navy. The fortifications from de Gomme's era were still present at the west side of the fort, and were in poor condition by that time. The Weevil estate was purchased in 1761 and the land was redeveloped into the Royal Clarence victualing yard. New defences were constructed for Gosport in 1778, with the bastioned Fort Monckton situated on the ground that had been occupied by Haselworth Castle in the Tudor era.

Further renovations took place from 1797 to 1803, amid fears of French invasion. This created a line of bastions defending Gosport all the way from Blockhouse Point up to Forton Lake on the far side of the town, with French prisoners of war making up a part of the construction workforce.

Much of fort Blockhouse was remodelled in 1813, with further modifications to the battery taking place in 1825 and adjustments to the bastion in 1845. The defences outside of Blockhouse point were however not effectively maintained, with James Fort and Charles Fort falling into ruin in the early 19th century. The defences were considered obsolete by the 1859 Royal Commission on the Defence of the United Kingdom. The stone parapet was reworked in 1863, and additional guns were added at the rear of the site.

Mining and submarine base (1877–1998)

The Fort Blockhouse Submarine Mining Establishment was founded in 1877, with additional structures added to the Blockhouse complex including a crane and pier, along with a light rail system to move explosives. Additional administrative buildings were added in 1884, when the site also became home to the School of Submarine Miners. The pier was extended in 1888, and additional rooms continued to be added for storage and tests until 1891. The Portsmouth Militia Division, which had recently been performing experiments with torpedoes that could be launched from a coastal defence at Fort Monkton, also moved to Blockhouse in 1892 and remained until 1907. The two forts were linked with a narrow gauge railway, which also extended to the facilities in Stokes Bay which were still in use for this purpose. The railway survived into the early 20th century.

Blockhouse was turned over to the Royal Navy in 1905 and, as HMS Dolphin, it became the home of the Royal Navy Submarine Service. The Napoleonic era defences that had extended out to loop around the west side of the town were removed, in order to facilitate transportation. Between the two world wars, the establishment expanded beyond the lines of the original fort on Blockhouse point however, and the prominent submarine escape tower was built in 1953, and opened in 1954. The need for such a training facility had been made apparent by the loss of HMS Truculent in 1950. The battery of the fort was disarmed in 1956, and additional buildings were added to support submarine operations in the mid-1960s. The end of the Cold War brought with it a reduction in defence requirements, with the threat of Soviet submarines having passed- and so in 1992 it was announced that the smaller submarine fleet would be leaving HMS Dolphin and moving west to HMNB Devonport. The last submarine left Dolphin in 1994. HMS Dolphin was declared surplus to requirements in 1996 and Dolphin was formally decommissioned in 1998.

Field hospital and training site (1996– present)

Part of the Blockhouse site became the Royal Defence Medical College in 1996, providing postgraduate education in the area. The venture was short lived however, with the college closing in 2002. Though the submarine base was closed in 1998, the Royal Navy Submarine School (RNSMS) remained at the fort until 23 December 1999, and some training continued at Blockhouse for a further twenty years. The submarine school was relocated to HMS Raleigh in Cornwall, with pressurised training remaining at the Blockhouse facility until 2008. The submarine escape tower remained in service until it too was closed in January 2020. Fort Blockhouse remains in use as the 33 military field hospital, under the 2nd Medical Brigade.

Planned disposal
In 2016, it was announced that Fort Blockhouse would be disposed of by the Ministry of Defence in 2020, as part of a wider package of reductions in defence estate. Surveys were undertaken from January to March 2020 to determine which structures at the site would become listed buildings, and major job cuts took place at the end of the year. The disposal date was later extended to at least 2023, and once more to 2025.

References

External links
 Victorian Forts data sheet
 Fort Blockhouse and Submarine Mining on the Fort Gilkicker website

Blockhouse
Blockhouse
Gosport
Blockhouse
1431 establishments in England
15th-century fortifications